Hubert Hajm (7 August 1914 – 1971) was a Slovenian alpine skier. He competed in the men's combined event at the 1936 Winter Olympics, representing Yugoslavia.

References

1914 births
1971 deaths
Slovenian male alpine skiers
Olympic alpine skiers of Yugoslavia
Alpine skiers at the 1936 Winter Olympics
Sportspeople from Jesenice, Jesenice